was a Japanese idol girl group formed in 2010 by the Amuse talent agency. The group's membership fell within the age range of Japanese compulsory education, typically containing between 10 and 12 members at a time who fall between the ages of 10 and 15. With the theme of school life and extracurricular club activities, when the academic year ends at the end of March, the group released an annual studio album, new members "transferred in" to the group, and others who finish compulsory education "graduated", or left.

Members of the group also belonged to one or more of its sub-units, which are modeled after school extracurricular clubs. Each club performed with its own theme and musical genre, and their music may be included in the main group's albums or released as a separate single.

The group disbanded on August 31, 2021.

Concept
The group was themed around the idea of school life and extracurricular activities, featuring a "principal", "teacher" , and sub-units designated as "clubs". Each May, new members from lower grades "transferred in" to the group.

History

2010–2011: Beginnings and Message 
Sakura Gakuin was created around April 2010 by the talent agency Amuse. Members of the group often blog in a class journal by posting notes handwritten on loose leaf paper. In August, the group participated in the first Tokyo Idol Festival (TIF). In October, the group formed the baton-twirling sub-unit Twinklestars, with seven members; in November, the group released its first single "Dear Mr. Socrates", which was sold only at live venues. Sakura Gakuin held its first solo event on November 28, 2010. 
On December 8, the group released its major debut single "Yume ni Mukatte / Hello! Ivy".

Sakura Gakuin's first album, Sakura Gakuin 2010 Nendo: Message, was scheduled to appear on March 23, 2011, but was postponed until April 27 due to the March 11 earthquake and tsunami. The same year, Hana Taguchi and Rinon Isono joined the group. On May 30, Twinklestars announced a new single, "Please! Please! Please!", for a July 6 release. In August, Sakura Gakuin performed at Tokyo Idol Festival 2011. On October 23, at an event held in Tokyo, the group announced that second single, "Verishuvi", would be released on December 21 through Universal Music; the song had its live debut on November 23.

2012: Friends, formation of more sub-units, and My Generation 
Sakura Gakuin's third single, "Tabidachi no Hi ni", was released on February 15, 2012, debuting at number 6 in the Oricon Daily Singles Chart for February 14. Three of the members, Ayami Mutō, Ayaka Miyoshi, and Airi Matsui, graduated from Sakura Gakuin in April 2012, and three new members—Yunano, Saki and Mariri—were transferred into the group in May 2012. In August, the group performed at TIF 2012, on August 4 and 5, and revealing that a new sub-unit would perform at the Sky Stage on the 4th; the following day, it was revealed to be a tennis club consisting of four members with Nene Sugisaki as the leader. On September 1, the science club Kagaku Kuymei Kikoh Logica? was officially revealed as another new unit. On October 1, the Logica? announced their first single, "Science Girl ▽ Silence Boy", for a November 21 release. On October 6, Babymetal announced their major label debut with "Ijime, Dame, Zettai" for January 9, 2013.

2013–2015: New look, Kizuna, and Kimi ni Todoke 
Sakura Gakuin released their fifth single, "My Graduation Toss", on February 27, 2013, as well as their third album My Generation on March 13. The group held the 2012 graduation concert for Suzuka Nakamoto and Mariri Sugimoto at Tokyo International Forum on March 31.

After sending fellow members Suzuka and Mariri, the group started their new school semester on May 5, 2013 at Shibuya Cultural Center Owada with two new members and a new beige uniform. The group later released the song, "Ganbare!!", which ranked 6th on the Oricon Weekly Chart. Sakura Gakuin later released their seventh single, "Jump Up (Chiisana Yūki)", and fourth DVD, Sakura Gakuin Festival 2013: Live Edition on February 12, 2014. The Road to Graduation 2013 Final was held at Shibuya Public Hall, where Marina Horiuchi, Raura Iida, Nene Sugisaki and Hinata Satō, the last of the original eight members, gave their farewells to the fans and remaining eight members.

The group later welcomed two new members, Sara Kurashima and Megumi Okada, in May 2014, bringing the total to ten members. In March 2015, the group held a graduation concert at which Moa Kikuchi, Yui Mizuno, Hana Taguchi, and Yunano Notsu bid goodbye to the fans and remaining six members. On May 6, six new members joined the group, bringing the total to twelve members. At the same time, Rinon Isono was appointed as the fifth Student Council President. The remaining two Year 3 members, Saki Ooga became the Education Chairman, while Saki Shirai was appointed as the third Talk Chairman.

2016–2019: Kirameki no Kakera, Yakusoku, My Road, Life Iro Asenai Hibi, and Story 
March 2016 marked the departure of Saki Ooga, Saki Shirai and Rinon Isono, but in May of the same year Momoe Mori, Tsugumi Aritomo and Yuzumi Shintani transferred in. 2016 also marked the departure of the "beige" uniforms, instating a dark gray one in its place, and the promotion of Sara Kurashima to class president, Aiko Yamaide to vice president and Mirena Kurosawa to MC chairman. Sara Kurashima and Mirena Kurosawa left the group in March 2017, with new members Miku Tanaka and Miki Yagi joining in May. Aiko Yamaide became the class president, Megumi Okada became the talk chairman, Momoko Okazaki became the perseverance ("ganbare") chairman, and Maaya Asou became the Education Chairman. On March 24, 2018, the graduation concert for Aiko Yamaide, Megumi Okada and Momoko Okazaki took place at Nakano Sun Plaza.

In May 2018, Sana Shiratori, Kokona Nonaka and Yume Nozaki joined the group. During the concert in which the new members were introduced, it was announced that Yuzumi Shintani had become class president, with Maaya Asou as talk chairman, Marin Hidaka as breakthrough ("hamidase") chairman, Kano Fujihira as performance chairman, and Soyoka Yoshida as education chairman.

On March 30, 2019, Maaya Asou, Marin Hidaka, and Yuzumi Shintani graduated from Sakura Gakuin. 2019 also marked the departure of the grey uniforms, enlisting a deep blue one in its place. On May 6, Neo Sato, Miko Todaka, and Sakia Kimura joined the group. It was also announced that Kano Fujihira had become class president, with Soyoka Yoshida as perseverance chairman, Tsugumi Aritomo as breakthrough chairman, and Momoe Mori as talk chairman.

A concert was planned to occur on March 29, 2020, to mark the graduations of Kano Fujihira, Soyoka Yoshida, Tsugumi Aritomo and Momoe Mori. However, the concert was postponed to May 29 due to the COVID-19 pandemic and then subsequently canceled. An alternative, livestream-only graduation was later planned for August 30.

2020-2021: 10th anniversary 

After the graduation of Kano Fujihira, Soyoka Yoshida, Tsugumi Aritomo, and Momoe Mori, Sakura Gakuin immediately began preparations for their 10th anniversary. On September 1, 2020, it was announced that Sakura Gakuin would continue as an 8-member group until their disbandment on August 31, 2021. All eight of the remaining members were given a position on the student council, with Kokona Nonaka as the tenth and final Student Council President. Sana Shiratori became the Talk Chairman, Miki Yagi became the third vice-president, and Miku Tanaka became the second spirit chairman, with Yume Nozaki as the first and only PR chairman, Neo Sato as the fourth education chairman, Miko Todaka as the third performance chairman, and Sakia Kimura as the first and only "reckless" chairman and also the youngest Sakura Gakuin member to ever be appointed onto the student council. The group held their final concert on August 29, 2021 at Nakano Sun Plaza, before disbanding two days later.

Members 
Sakura Gakuin employed a line-up changing system in which older members would leave the group and new members joined each year. Since the group's theme was that of an elementary and junior high school, when a member graduated from junior high, specifically her third year, she would leave Sakura Gakuin as well, during a ceremony the group held around the end of the Japanese school year (late March) in which these members would "graduate".

At the time of the group's disbandment, the group consisted of the following eight members.
Note: Names presented here are in Western format (i.e. given name followed by family name) as opposed to Japanese name.

Past members
Members that leave Sakura Gakuin also complete ninth grade education in school, and are considered "graduated".

Member timeline

Sub-units 
The sub-units of the group were described as extra-curricular activities, each with its own theme and genre. For example, the Heavy Music Club Babymetal performed music which combined J-pop and heavy metal and wears Gothic Lolita outfits; the Go Home Club Sleepiece performed live wearing pajamas, with light choreography invoking movements during sleep; and the Science Club Kagaku Kyumei Kikoh Logica?, which members perform wearing lab coats, aimed to get people more interested in science and uses scientific terms in the lyrics.

The Heavy Music Club, performing as Babymetal, was spun off from Sakura Gakuin in 2013 following the graduation of its lead singer, Suzuka Nakamoto, and is now considered a separate musical act, with no current Sakura Gakuin member being a member of the club.

An italicized English name in the "club" column denotes that the group in question is presently known to be defunct.

Discography 

Sakura Gakuin 2010 Nendo: Message (2011)
Sakura Gakuin 2011 Nendo: Friends (2012)
Sakura Gakuin 2012 Nendo: My Generation (2013)
Sakura Gakuin 2013 Nendo: Kizuna (2014)
Sakura Gakuin 2014 Nendo: Kimi ni Todoke (2015)
Sakura Gakuin 2015 Nendo: Kirameki no Kakera (2016)
Sakura Gakuin 2016 Nendo: Yakusoku (2017)
Sakura Gakuin 2017 Nendo: My Road (2018)
Sakura Gakuin 2018 Nendo: Life Iro Asenai Hibi (2019)
Sakura Gakuin 2019 Nendo: Story (2020)
Sakura Gakuin 2020 Nendo: Thank You (2021)

References

External links 

  
 Official profile at Amuse Inc. 
 

 
Japanese pop music groups
Japanese girl groups
Japanese idol groups
Japanese-language singers
Musical groups established in 2010
2010 establishments in Japan
Universal Music Japan artists
Child musical groups
Musical groups from Tokyo
Fictional schools
Amuse Inc. artists
2021 disestablishments in Japan
Musical groups disestablished in 2021